Jalil Khazal (Arabic: جليل خزعل; born 1 January 1960) is an Iraqi poet, writer and a researcher specializing in literature and child education. Born in Baghdad, he has written more than 80 books for children and has composed tens of songs, theater plays, cartoons and animated films, shows, radio programs and television programs for children.

Education 
Khazal received a master's degree in Education and Psychology from the College of Education, University of Baghdad.

Career 
Khazal began publishing in the mid-seventies of the twentieth century, and was writing thoughts, poems and stories for adults which were published in several local newspapers and magazines. Daily newspapers had allocated sections for children back then, so Jalil sent one of his poems and it was quickly published, and his poems were read on a television program that was about reading the daily newspapers. Khalil was encouraged and sent another poem, which was also published, which earned him a permanent place for writing in the children's sections. Hussein Qadroui had also sung one of Khazal's poems on TV, which was his start with children's songs. Two of his poems were also chosen to be included in the school curriculum for the primary stage, so he started specializing in writing for children. After graduating from university, he worked in teaching and was appointed editor at the Children's Culture House, after which he climbed the ranks until he got promoted and became editor-in-chief.

Khazal has published several children's books in the fields of poetry, stories, illustrated stories and scientific books, in addition to dozens of research papers, studies and press articles regarding children's literature and culture. He has also written dozens of songs, plays, animated films, and radio and television series.

Khazal held the position of managing editor of the magazine "Majalati" for children at the Children's Culture House in Baghdad, "Habibi" magazine and director of the publishing department in the same house, and "Mizmar" magazine. 

He also supervised the children's section in the Iraqi magazine "IMN", issued by the Iraqi Media Network Al Iraqiya. He also became the head of the Children's Literature Club in the General Union of Writers and Writers in Iraq, as well as the Research and Studies Department at the Institute of Music Studies of the Department of Musical Arts in the Iraqi Ministry of Culture, and he is the founder and an official of the Childhood Research Unit at the House of Wisdom in Baghdad.

As an academic, he worked as a lecturer for children's literature in the Kindergarten Department of the College of Education for Girls at the University of Baghdad, and his texts are taught in the curriculum of kindergarten and primary stages, institutes and universities in Iraq and other Arab countries.

Khazal has won many local and Arab awards for his literary works for children. His works have been printed in most countries of the Arab world, and have been translated into English, German, Italian, Kurdish, Persian and Japanese. He was chosen among three distinguished poets in the world in 2018, where three of his poems were published in the book "The Year of the Poet 2018" in the United States after being translated into English.

Memberships 

 Member of the Union of Iraqi Writers and Writers
 Member of the Iraqi Journalists Syndicate
 Member of the Union of Arab Writers and Writers
 Member of the Union of Arab Journalists
 Member of the International Federation of Journalists
 Member of the Iraqi Teachers Syndicate
 Member of the Iraqi Musicians Union
 Member of the National Committee for Education
 Member and founder of the Iraqi Centre for Children's Culture, Baghdad

Awards and honours 
Khazal is the record holder in the number of creativity awards granted by the Ministry of Culture in Iraq.

 First Prize, Child Song Contest, Baghdad, 1977.
 First Prize, Child Welfare Authority, Children's Poetry, Baghdad, 1994.
 Creativity Award in Children's Literature, Ministry of Culture, Baghdad 1998.
 Creativity Award in Children's Literature, Ministry of Culture, Baghdad 1999.
 Creativity Award in Children's Literature, Ministry of Culture, Baghdad 2000.
 Creativity Award in Children's Literature, Ministry of Culture, Baghdad 2001.
 Silver Award, Cairo International Festival, 2002, for a group of songs and animated films.
 First Prize, Competition of the First Martyr Muhammad Baqir Al-Sadr, Children's Poetry, 2008.
 Children's Poetry Award, House of Cultural Affairs, Ministry of Culture, 2012.
 First prize, competition of the Arab Theater Authority in Sharjah, competition for writing theatrical text directed to the child, 2013, for his text “The Gift of the Bird”.
 Best Words and Poems Award, Al Husseini Little Festival for the Fifth Child Theater, Karbala, 2019.
 First Prize, Animation Forum, Cairo, 2019, for the movie "The Dream of Olives" (Jalil Khazal wrote the lyrics of his songs).
 Second prize, English Language Olympiad, Amman, 2019, for the Mermaid play.

Writings

References 

Iraqi writers
21st-century Iraqi poets
21st-century Iraqi novelists
1960 births
Living people
20th-century Iraqi poets